The 1964–65 Indiana Hoosiers men's basketball team represented Indiana University in the Big Ten Conference. Their head coach was Branch McCracken, who was in his 24th and final year. The team played its home games on campus in New Fieldhouse in Bloomington.

Indiana was not invited to participate in any postseason tournament. (In 1965, the NCAA tournament had 23 teams and the NIT had fourteen.)

Roster

Schedule/Results

|-
!colspan=8| Regular Season
|-

Rankings

References

Indiana Hoosiers
Indiana Hoosiers men's basketball seasons
Indiana Hoosiers men's basketball
Indiana Hoosiers men's basketball